Sudden Manhattan is a 1996 comedy film written and directed by and starring Adrienne Shelly. The movie was distributed by Phaedra Cinema, which specialized in independent movies such as this. The cast included Tim Guinee and Roger Rees. It was filmed in New York and tells the story of a group of Manhattanites, one of whom, Donna (Shelly), witnesses a murder.

Cast
 Adrienne Shelly as Donna
 Tim Guinee as Adam
 Roger Rees as Murphy
 Louise Lasser as Dominga
 Hynden Walch as Georgie
 Kevin Cahoon as Georgie's Brother
 Jon Sklaroff as Ian

References

External links 
 

1996 films
American comedy films
American independent films
1996 comedy films
Films set in Manhattan
1996 independent films
1996 directorial debut films
Films shot in New York City
1990s English-language films
1990s American films